Cameron Winslow (1854–1932) was a U.S. Navy admiral. Admiral Winslow may also refer to:

Herbert Winslow (1848–1914), U.S. Navy rear admiral
John Ancrum Winslow (1811–1873), U.S. Navy rear admiral

See also
Alfred Winsloe (1852–1931), British Royal Navy admiral